Big Brother is a reality show shown on Kanal A in which a number of contestants live in an isolated house trying to avoid being evicted by the public with the aim of winning a large cash prize at the end of the run. It is based on the international Big Brother format produced by Endemol. It first aired on March 17, 2007.

The first Slovenian season of Big Brother ran 85 days, started on March 17, 2007 and ended on June 9, 2007. The host of the show is Nina Osenar. The prize is 75,000 Euro.

Housemates
In the first season, there are 12 original housemates. At later stages, 6 new housemates entered the house. Andrej the Australian and Janez's brother is the winner. Here are all the participants:

First Batch
The following housemates entered on Day 1. In parentheses were their ages as of the time they stayed in the house.

 Andrej (27)  - WINNER
 Miha (21)
 Stane (20)
 Tina (22)
 Alen (26)
 Jasmina (19)
 Suzana (38)
 Robert (31)
 Nina (28)
 Jessy (20)
 Aleš (27)
 Veronika (23)

Second Batch
The following housemates entered on Day 8. In parentheses were their ages as of the time they stayed in the house.

 Sonja (26)

Third Batch
The following housemates entered on Day 21. In parentheses were their ages as of the time they stayed in the house.

 Tjaša (19)
 Pero (24)

Fourth Batch
The following housemates entered on Day 49. In parentheses were their ages as of the time they stayed in the house.

 Marina (21)
 Janez (55)
 Alisa (21)

Big Brother Swap 

The official website announced on Day 27 (April 12, 2007) that one Philippine housemate would trade places with a housemate from the Slovenian version. Days later, Tina was chosen to swap with Bruce.

Promotion ads for this event likened this to an alien abduction because the Philippine housemates were not aware that Bruce will trade places with Tina, a foreigner, until Tina entered the Philippine House. On the other hand, the Slovenian housemates already knew of the Swap and prepared for this event, which was expected to be a cultural exchange of sorts for both sides. The swap took place starting Day 36 (April 21) and ended on Day 41 (April 26), when the swapped housemates returned to their respective Houses.

Tina Semolic, a 22-year-old former beauty queen, was chosen by the Philippine version's staff because of her personality "would fit well" with the Filipino housemates, as well as being nice and not too aggressive. On the other hand, Bruce was chosen by the Slovenian staff because of his physique and his "very Filipino" characteristics that would stir up competition among the men there.

To let Filipino viewers know about Bruce's situation in the Slovenian House, some footage from the Slovenian version related to Bruce was also shown, aside from the events inside the Philippine House. English conversations recorded on both Houses were subtitled into Filipino, while any Slovenian conversation and comment was dubbed over by Filipino voice actors to let the Filipino viewers understand better.

Below is a list of activities each swapped housemate did in their respective host country's Houses, aside from introductions and trading of basic phrases:

While Tina left the Philippines without much incident, Bruce left Slovenia with controversy brewing up behind him. Slovenian housemates Miha and Pero made inappropriate remarks about Bruce — remarks that did not sit well with both Big Brother and the viewers there. Because of that and Pero's "plan" of "stabbing Big Brother," Big Brother removed Pero from the Slovenian House and then added Miha to the list of nominees for eviction, which already included Jasmina and Sonja.

Tina was later evicted on Day 63 of the Slovenian version, about five weeks after the swap.

On Day 125 of the Philippine version, Tina returned to the Pinoy Big Brother house to have a celebratory dinner with the Big 4, Bea, Gee-Ann, Mickey and Wendy. She left the house the same night and participated in the Finale, where she danced various Philippine dances and took part in the awarding ceremony for the Big 4.

Nomination Table

References

2007 Slovenian television seasons
Slovenia